Thomas Djilan (born 14 January 1983) is a retired Beninese football goalkeeper.

References

1983 births
Living people
Beninese footballers
Benin international footballers
Dynamic Togolais players
Lions de l'Atakory players
Postel Sport FC players
AS Dragons FC de l'Ouémé players
Renacimiento FC players
Association football goalkeepers
Beninese expatriate footballers
Expatriate footballers in Togo
Beninese expatriate sportspeople in Togo
Expatriate footballers in Equatorial Guinea
Beninese expatriate sportspeople in Equatorial Guinea